The W.S. McClintock House is a historic house at 83 West Main Street in Marianna, Arkansas.  It is a grand two-story wood-frame Classical Revival building designed by Charles L. Thompson and built in 1912.  The symmetrical main facade has at its center a massive two-story portico supported by groups of Ionic columns, with a dentillated cornice and a flat roof.  A single-story porch extends from both sides of this portico, supported by Doric columns, and wrapping around to the sides of the house.  This porch is topped by an ironwork railing.

The house was listed on the National Register of Historic Places in 1977.

See also
J. M. McClintock House, at 43 Main St., also designed by Thompson and NRHP-listed
National Register of Historic Places listings in Lee County, Arkansas

References

Houses on the National Register of Historic Places in Arkansas
Neoclassical architecture in Arkansas
Houses completed in 1912
Houses in Lee County, Arkansas
1912 establishments in Arkansas
National Register of Historic Places in Lee County, Arkansas